Macreupoca spectralis is a moth in the family Crambidae. It is found in Chile.

References

Moths described in 1964
Glaphyriinae
Endemic fauna of Chile